Abass Chernor Bundu (born 1948 in Gbinti, Port Loko District) is a Sierra Leonean politician, diplomat, and the current Speaker of the Sierra Leone House of Parliament, in office since April 25, 2018  . Bundu was elected speaker by receiving 70 votes in Parliament. The main opposition the  All People's Congress, which won the most seats in Parliament, boycotted the election process in protest  and did not nominate a candidate for speaker  . Bundu is a veteran politician, and a very close ally and personal friend  of Sierra Leone"s president  Julius Maada Bio

Before being elected speaker, Bundu was the northern regional chairman of the Sierra Leone People's Party (SLPP). He is one of the most senior and one of the most influential members of the ruling Sierra Leone People's Party 

Bundu is the older brother of Ibrahim Bundu, a member of Parliament of the main opposition All People's Congress.

From 1989 to 1993, Bundu was the executive secretary of the Economic Community of West African States. Bundu was the head of several ministries in Sierra Leone, including Foreign Affairs and Agriculture. He was the presidential candidate of the now defunct Progressive People's Party (PPP) in the 1996 Sierra Leone presidential election, where he was defeated in the first round of voting after winning 2.9% of the votes.

Bundu holds a Bachelor of Laws degree from the Australian National University and both a Master of Laws and a PhD in International Law from the University of Cambridge in England.

Early life
Abass Chernor Bundu was born in the rural town of Gbinti, Port Loko District in the Northern Province of Sierra Leone. Bundu was born into a prominent Bundu Family who are of Fula and Temne descents. Abass Bundu grew up in a deeply religious Muslim household and he is a devout Muslim.

Education
Bundu attended the St. Andrews Secondary School in Bo, the Methodist Boys' High School in Freetown and the St. Edward's Secondary School also in Freetown. While in secondary school, Bundu was a very brilliant student and he was highly admired by his fellow students and teachers.

Immediately after secondary school, Bundu left Sierra Leone as a youth and moved abroad to further his education. He holds a Bachelor of Laws degree from the Australian National University and both a Master of Laws and a PhD in International Law from the University of Cambridge, England. He is also a Barrister-at-Law.

Career
Bundu's numerous positions include Assistant Director of International Affairs and Consultant in Constitutional Law in the Commonwealth Secretariat in London from 1975–82; Executive Secretary of Economic Community of West African States (ECOWAS) from 1989–1993, the posts of Foreign Minister (1994–1995), Minister of Agriculture 1982–85; and Presidential candidate in the 1996 Presidential election in Sierra Leone. Bundu failed to garner much support in the election, gaining just under 30,000 votes or 2.9% of the national vote.  He is an expert on West African affairs and a renowned expert on constitutional and international law. Bundu has written a critical analysis of the Civil War in Sierra Leone, Democracy by Force?

Opposition to President Momoh
In 1991, Dr. Bundu strongly criticised President Joseph Saidu Momoh's government because of clauses their party wished to add to Sierra Leone's constitution. He was then forced to leave the All People's Congress (APC).

Dr. Bundu contested the 1996 elections as not democratically free and fair.

Presidential campaign
In 1996, Bundu formed his own political party and ran for president in Sierra Leone. His bid was unsuccessful.

Alleged corruption and exoneration
In 1996 Bundu was prosecuted for alleged illegal sale of Sierra Leone passports under the immigration investment programme.  In October 2005 Government of Sierra Leone dropped the prosecution and publicly exonerated Bundu of any wrongdoing based on new evidence which, had it been available in 1996, would not have given rise to any prosecution.

References

External links
https://web.archive.org/web/20140528005444/http://politicosl.com/2012/04/like-abass-bundu-like-lilian-lisk/
https://web.archive.org/web/20131102014131/http://news.sl/drwebsite/publish/article_200523995.shtml
https://web.archive.org/web/20140527214324/http://news.sl/drwebsite/exec/view.cgi?archive=2&num=1030&printer=1
 Democracy by Force?: A study of international military intervention in the conflict in Sierra Leone from 1991–2000 by Abass Bundu
https://web.archive.org/web/20140528010414/http://news.sl/drwebsite/exec/view.cgi?archive=2&num=1123

Living people
1948 births
Speakers of the Parliament of Sierra Leone
Foreign Ministers of Sierra Leone
Sierra Leonean writers
Sierra Leonean academics
Alumni of St. Edward's Secondary School, Freetown
Executive Secretaries of the Economic Community of West African States
Temne people
People from Port Loko District
Sierra Leonean diplomats
Sierra Leonean Fula people
Sierra Leonean Muslims